The Santa Marta warbler (Myiothlypis basilica) is a species of bird in the family Parulidae.
It is endemic to the Santa Marta Mountains in Colombia.

Its natural habitats are subtropical or tropical moist montane forests and heavily degraded former forest.
It is threatened by habitat loss.

The Santa Marta warbler was formerly placed in the genus Basileuterus. It was moved to the genus Myiothlypis based on the results of a molecular phylogenetic study published in 2012.

References

External links
BirdLife Species Factsheet.

Santa Marta warbler
Birds of the Sierra Nevada de Santa Marta
Endemic birds of Colombia
Santa Marta warbler
Santa Marta warbler
Taxonomy articles created by Polbot